Eucalyptus woollsiana is a species of tree that is endemic to eastern Australia. It has rough, fibrous bark on the trunk, smooth bark above, lance-shaped adult leaves, flower buds in groups of five or seven, white flowers and cup-shaped fruit.

Description
It has rough, fibrous, grey bark on the trunk, smooth grey to yellowish bark above.

Taxonomy and naming
Eucalyptus woollsiana was first formally described in 1901 by Richard Thomas Baker in Proceedings of the Linnean Society of New South Wales.

Distribution and habitat
This eucalypt grows on flat land, often with brigalow (Acacia harpophylla) and belah (Casuarina cristata) on heavy clay soils. It is widespread in inland Queensland south from Injune to the western slopes and plains of New South Wales. It intergrades with E. microcarpa at the southern end of its range.

Conservation status
This species is classified as "least concern" under the Queensland Government Nature Conservation Act 1992.

References

woollsiana
Trees of Australia
Flora of Queensland
Flora of New South Wales
Myrtales of Australia
Plants described in 1901
Taxa named by Richard Thomas Baker